The Journal of Occupational Health Psychology is a peer-reviewed academic journal published bimonthly by the American Psychological Association. It "publishes research, theory, and public policy articles in occupational health psychology, an interdisciplinary field representing a broad range of backgrounds, interests, and specializations. Occupational health psychology concerns the application of psychology to improving the quality of work life and to protecting and promoting the safety, health, and well-being of workers." The current editor-in-chief is Sharon Clarke, PhD.

History 
The idea for the journal emerged in discussions that took place in the 1990s among Steven Sauter and his colleagues at the National Institute for Occupational Safety and Health, Gary VandenBos (American Psychological Association), and James Campbell Quick (University of Texas at Arlington). With Quick named as editor-in-chief, the journal was first published in 1996. It "focuses on the work environment, the individual, and the work-family interface." It is published by the American Psychological Association.

Abstracting and indexing 
The journal is abstracted and indexed in:

According to the Journal Citation Reports, the journal has a 2020 impact factor of 7.25.

See also 
 European Academy of Occupational Health Psychology
 Health psychology
 Occupational Health Science
 Occupational medicine
 Occupational stress
 Society for Occupational Health Psychology
 Work & Stress

References

External links 
 
 European Academy of Occupational Health Psychology
 Society for Occupational Health Psychology

Occupational health psychology
Publications established in 1996
Occupational psychology journals
Occupational safety and health journals
Quarterly journals
English-language journals
American Psychological Association academic journals